Shauna Devine is a medical historian with the Western University, London, Ontario, Canada. Her first book, Learning from the Wounded: The Civil War and the Rise of American Medical Science (2014) won the 2015 Tom Watson Brown Book Award of the Society of Civil War Historians and Watson-Brown Foundation, the 2015 Wiley-Silver Prize of the Center for Civil War Research at the University of Mississippi, and was named an Outstanding Academic Title of 2015 by Choice.

She is a board member of the National Museum of Civil War Medicine.

Selected publications

Books
 Learning from the Wounded: The Civil War and the Rise of American Medical Science. The University of North Carolina Press, Chapel Hill, 2014.

References

External links 
https://civilwarmed.libsyn.com/shauna-devine-horrors-and-healing

Living people
Year of birth missing (living people)
Historians of the American Civil War
Women historians
Medical historians